1135 Colchis;) is a background asteroid from the central region of the asteroid belt. It was discovered on 3 October 1929, by Soviet astronomer Grigory Neujmin at the Simeiz Observatory on the Crimean peninsula. It was named for the ancient Kingdom of Colchis.

Orbit and classification 

Colchis is a non-family asteroid of the main belt's background population when applying the hierarchical clustering method to its proper orbital elements. It orbits the Sun in the central main-belt at a distance of 2.4–3.0 AU once every 4 years and 4 months (1,589 days; semi-major axis 2.67 AU). Its orbit has an eccentricity of 0.12 and an inclination of 5° with respect to the ecliptic. The body's observation arc begins at Lowell Observatory in September 1929, or four days prior its official discovery observation at Simeiz.

Naming 

This minor planet was named after the ancient Kingdom of Colchis, bordering on Black Sea south of the Caucasus mountains, in what is now part of Georgia. The  was mentioned in The Names of the Minor Planets by Paul Herget in 1955.

Physical characteristics 

In the SMASS classification, Colchis is a Xk-subtype that transitions between the X- and K-type asteroids. Conversely, the Wide-field Infrared Survey Explorer characterizes it as a primitive P-type asteroid.

Rotation period 

In March 2001, a rotational lightcurve of Colchis was obtained from photometric observations by Robert Stephens. Lightcurve analysis gave a rotation period of 23.47 hours with a brightness variation of 0.45 magnitude. In September 2016, French amateur astronomer Patrick Sogorb measured an identical period and an amplitude of 0.46 magnitude. A similar period of 23.41 hours with an amplitude of 0.33 magnitude was obtained by astronomers at the Palomar Transient Factory in January 2014.

Poles 

In 2016, two modeled lightcurves using photometric data from the Lowell Photometric Database (LPD) and other sources, gave a concurring period of 23.4827 and 23.4830 hours, respectively. Each modeled lightcurve also determined two spin axis of (139.0°, −58.0°) and (330.0°, −81.0°), as well as (7.0°, −54.0°) and (168.0°, −56.0°) in ecliptic coordinates (λ, β), respectively.

Diameter and albedo 

According to the surveys carried out by the Infrared Astronomical Satellite IRAS, the Japanese Akari satellite and the NEOWISE mission of NASA's WISE telescope, Colchis measures between 45.341 and 50.64 kilometers in diameter and its surface has an albedo between 0.05 and 0.068.

The Collaborative Asteroid Lightcurve Link derives an albedo of 0.0437 and a diameter of 50.50 kilometers based on an absolute magnitude of 10.5.

References

External links 
 Lightcurve Database Query (LCDB), at www.minorplanet.info
 Dictionary of Minor Planet Names, Google books
 Asteroids and comets rotation curves, CdR – Geneva Observatory, Raoul Behrend
 Discovery Circumstances: Numbered Minor Planets (1)-(5000) – Minor Planet Center
 
 

001135
Discoveries by Grigory Neujmin
Named minor planets
001135
19291003